"Beauty" is a song by the American heavy metal band Mötley Crüe, released as the second single and final single on their 1997 album Generation Swine. The song charted at number 37 on the Mainstream rock charts.

Charts

References

1997 singles
1997 songs
Mötley Crüe songs
Songs written by Nikki Sixx
Songs written by Scott Humphrey
Songs written by Tommy Lee
Elektra Records singles
Industrial rock songs
Alternative metal songs